Sharon Finnan-White  is a former Australian netball player and a two-time winner of the INF Netball World Cup with the Australian national netball team.

Finnan was born in the inner-Sydney suburb of Surry Hills, New South Wales. She played for the New South Wales Under-21 team and was invited to attend the Australian Institute of Sport program in 1988. She was first selected to play for the national team in the 1990 Commonwealth Games and retired from netball in 2000.

, Finnan-White lives in Townsville.

In the 1992 Queen's Birthday Honours list, she was awarded the Medal of the Order of Australia. In 2000, she was awarded the Australian Sports Medal for services to netball development.

References

Living people
Netball players from Sydney
Queensland Firebirds players
Indigenous Australian netball players
Recipients of the Medal of the Order of Australia
Australia international netball players
Recipients of the Australian Sports Medal
Sydney Sandpipers players
Australian Institute of Sport netball players
Esso/Mobil Superleague players
1967 births
1991 World Netball Championships players
1999 World Netball Championships players